Far High House Meadows  is a Site of Special Scientific Interest in Upper Weardale in west County Durham, England. It consists of three fields, located just south of Burnhope Reservoir, some 3 km west of the village of Ireshopeburn. Two of the fields are maintained as northern hay meadows by traditional farming methods, without re-seeding or the application of artificial fertilisers; the third is grazed as pasture.

The hay fields are dominated by common bent, Agrostis capillaris, and sweet vernal-grass, Anthoxanthum odoratum, and support a diversity of forbs, among which globe-flower, Trollius europaeus, and marsh-marigold, Caltha palustris, are well represented, with early-purple orchid, Orchis mascula, among the species present in the wetter areas.

The pasture is a mix of acidic upland grassland, dry grassland and flushes, the last dominated by rushes and sedges.

References

Sites of Special Scientific Interest in County Durham
Meadows in County Durham
Stanhope, County Durham